The United States ten-dollar bill ($10) is a denomination of U.S. currency. The obverse of the bill features the portrait of Alexander Hamilton, who served as the first U.S. Secretary of the Treasury. The reverse features the U.S. Treasury Building. All $10 bills issued today are Federal Reserve Notes.

As of December 2018, the average life of a $10 bill in circulation is 5.3 years before it is replaced due to wear. Ten-dollar bills are delivered by Federal Reserve Banks in yellow straps.

The source of the portrait on the $10 bill is John Trumbull's 1805 painting of Hamilton that belongs to the portrait collection of New York City Hall. The $10 bill is unique in that it is the only denomination in circulation in which the portrait faces to the left. It also features one of two non-presidents on currently issued U.S. bills, the other being Benjamin Franklin on the $100 bill.  Hamilton is also the only person not born in the continental United States or British America (he was from the West Indies) currently depicted on U.S. paper currency; three others have been depicted in the past: Albert Gallatin, Switzerland ($500 1862/63 Legal Tender), George Meade, Spain ( 1890/91 Treasury Note), and Robert Morris, England ( 1862/63 Legal Tender; $10 1878/80 Silver Certificate).

Large size note history 
( 7.4218 × 3.125 in ≅ 189 × 79 mm)

 
  The Roman numeral "X" may represent the origin of the slang term "sawbuck" to mean a $10 bill.
  The notes could also be spent for exactly $10.
  It is unknown if the note could actually be spent for $10 plus interest.
  This note is nicknamed a "jackass note" because the eagle on the front looks like a donkey when the note is turned upside down.
  The back of the bill featured a vignette of U.S. gold coins.

  The blue and green tinting that was present on the obverse was removed and the design on the reverse was completely changed.
  The reverse, unlike any other federally issued note, was printed in black ink and featured the word  in large block letters.
 
 
  The note featured a portrait of General Philip Sheridan.  The reverse featured an ornate design that took up almost the entire note.
 

   This United States Note was the only one to mention the legal provision that authorized its issuance. The reverse featured an allegorical figure representing Columbia between two Roman-styled pillars.
  It had a blue seal, and a woman on the reverse.
 
 
  The note initially had a red treasury seal and serial numbers; however, they were changed to blue.

  The obverse was similar to the 1914 Federal Reserve notes except for large wording in the middle of the bill and a portrait with no border on the left side of the bill. Each note was an obligation of the issuing bank and could only be redeemed at the corresponding bank.
 
  Some of the design aspects of this note, such as the bottom border and numeral 10 overprinted with the word , were transferred over to the series of 1928 $10 bill.

Small size note history 

( ≅ )

  All variations of the  bill would carry the same portrait of Alexander Hamilton, same border design on the obverse, and the same reverse with a vignette of the U.S. Treasury building. The  bill was issued as a Federal Reserve Note with a green seal and serial numbers and as a gold certificate with a golden seal and serial numbers. The car parked outside of the Treasury Department building is based on a number of different cars manufactured at the time and was the creation of the Bureau designer who developed the artwork that served as a model for the engraving, because government agencies were prohibited from endorsing any specific manufacturer or product, according to a bureau of engraving and printing pamphlet. The tiny building to the right rear of the treasury building is the American Security and Trust Company Building, which for some years advertised itself as "right on the money".
  This was the only small-sized  bill that had a different border design on the obverse. The serial numbers and seal on it were brown.
  The obverse had a similar design style to the 1928  Silver Certificates; however, phrasing on the  bill was different from the  bill. This issue, with the series date of 1933, was not widely released into general circulation. Surviving examples of these notes are quite rare and valued at $10,000 to $30,000 in the numismatic community depending on their condition.
 
  Phrasing on the certificate was changed to reflect the Silver Purchase Act of 1934.
  A  Silver Certificate was printed with a yellow instead of blue treasury seal; these notes were given to U.S. troops in North Africa. These notes, too, could be declared worthless if seized by the enemy.
  Most noticeably, the treasury seal, gray word , and the Federal Reserve Seal were made smaller, the words  were added between them and the serial number; also, the Federal Reserve seal had spikes added around it, like the Treasury seal.
 
  Also, the obligation was shortened to its current wording, . Also during this time, production of Silver Certificates ends.
 
 
  Even though the notes read Series 1990, the first bills were printed in July 1992.
 
  The major changes were a revised, larger, slightly off-center portrait of Hamilton and a revised vignette of the U.S. Treasury building, now facing front. The plastic security strip reads "USA TEN" and now glows orange under a black light. Like the new , the bills were first printed in December 1999.
  The reverse features small yellow EURion 10s and have the fine lines removed from around the vignette of the United States Treasury building. These notes were issued in series 2004A with Cabral-Snow signatures. The first notes were printed in July 2005.

Series dates

Small size

Rejected redesign and new 2020 bill 
On June 17, 2015, Treasury Secretary Jack Lew announced that a woman's portrait would be featured on a redesigned ten-dollar bill by 2020. The Department of Treasury was seeking the public's input on who should appear on the new bill during the design phase.

Removal of Hamilton was controversial. Many believed that Hamilton, as the first Secretary of the Treasury, should remain on U.S. Currency in some form, all the while thinking that U.S. Currency was long overdue to feature a female historical figure – names that had been raised included Eleanor Roosevelt, Harriet Tubman, and Susan B. Anthony. This led to the Treasury Department stating that Hamilton would remain on the bill in some way. The $10 bill was chosen because it was scheduled for a regular security redesign, a years-long process. The redesigned ten-dollar bill was to be the first U.S. note to incorporate tactile features to assist those with visual disabilities.

On April 20, 2016, it was announced that Alexander Hamilton would remain the primary face on the $10 bill, due in part to the sudden popularity of the first Treasury Secretary after the success of the 2015 Broadway musical Hamilton. It was simultaneously announced that Harriet Tubman's likeness would appear on the $20 bill while Andrew Jackson would now appear on the reverse with the White House.

The design for the reverse of the new $10 bill was set to feature the heroines of the Women's Suffrage Movement in the United States, including Susan B. Anthony, Alice Paul, Sojourner Truth, Elizabeth Cady Stanton, Lucretia Mott, and the participants of the 1913 Woman Suffrage Procession who marched in Washington D.C. in favor of full voting rights for American women.

On August 31, 2017, Treasury Secretary Steven Mnuchin said that he would not commit to putting Tubman on the twenty-dollar bill, explaining "People have been on the bills for a long period of time. This is something we’ll consider; right now we have a lot more important issues to focus on." According to a Bureau of Engraving and Printing spokesperson, the next redesigned bill will be the ten-dollar bill, not set to be released into circulation until at least 2026. Because of this, it appears that a redesigned twenty-dollar bill featuring Tubman might not be released until years after the original 2020 release date.

See also 

 Ten Dollar Bill (Lichtenstein)

References

Sources

External links 
 The 2006 edition (2004 Series) of the 10 dollar bill

Currencies introduced in 1861
Cultural depictions of Alexander Hamilton
010
Ten-base-unit banknotes